Toppåsen is a mountain of Hurdal municipality in the Akershus region of southeastern Norway.

mountains of Viken